The BARLA Lancashire Cup was a knock-out rugby league competition for amateur teams in the historic county of Lancashire. It was administered by the British Amateur Rugby League Association (BARLA). As of 2017, the competition hasn't been held since the 2011–12 season.

Between 1905 and 1993, a Lancashire Cup was competed for by the professional sides.

Winners

See also

Rugby league county cups
BARLA National Cup
North West Counties
Pennine League

References

External links 
 BARLA Official Website

Rugby league in Lancashire
Rugby league in Greater Manchester
Rugby league in Merseyside
BARLA competitions